Mehdi Amini (born 16 May 1996) is an Iranian professional footballer who plays as a goalkeeper for Tercera División RFEF club Juventud de Torremolinos.

Club career

Sepahan
Amini started in the Sepahan youth system and signed a professional contract with the club in the summer of 2016. Amini made his professional debut in 2016 in an Iranian Hazfi Cup match. He made his Persian Gulf Pro League debut on 24 November 2016 in a 1–1 draw against Foolad.

Club career statistics 

Last Update:1 December 2016

References

https://www.varzesh3.com/tag/937884/%D9%85%D9%87%D8%AF%DB%8C-%D8%A7%D9%85%DB%8C%D9%86%DB%8C
.

..
https://www.varzesh3.com/news/1776451/%D8%A7%D9%85%DB%8C%D9%86%DB%8C-%D8%A8%D8%A7%D8%B2%DB%8C-%D8%A8%D8%A7-%D8%B3%D8%A7%DB%8C%D9%BE%D8%A7-%D8%B1%D8%A7-%D8%AF%D8%B1%D8%A2%D9%88%D8%B1%D8%AF%D9%85-%D8%AA%D8%A7-%D8%B3%D9%82%D9%88%D8%B7-%D9%86%DA%A9%D9%86%DB%8C%D9%85

External links 

 Amini on Instagram

1996 births
Living people
People from Isfahan Province
Iranian footballers
Association football goalkeepers
Sepahan S.C. footballers
Paykan F.C. players
Footballers at the 2018 Asian Games
Asian Games competitors for Iran

https://int.soccerway.com/players/mehdi-amini/303302/

Mahdi Amini zazerani at IranLeague.ir
Mahdi Amini zazerani at Soccerway

Stub icon	
This Iran-related article is a stub. You can help Wikipedia by expanding it.